Hierodoris electrica is a moth of the family Oecophoridae. It was described by Edward Meyrick in 1889. It is endemic to New Zealand, where it has been reported from the northern and southern parts of the South Island. The larva of H. electrica has yet to be described. The wingspan is between 15 and 16.5 mm. The ground colour of the forewings is dark brown, with narrow yellow scales overlaying this base colour. The hindwings are brown. The known larval host species is Olearia nummulariifolia.

Taxonomy
This species was first described by Edward Meyrick in 1889 and named Heliostibes electrica using two specimens collected at Mount Arthur at an altitude of 4700 ft. In 1988 J. S. Dugdale moved this species to the genus Hierodoris. The female lectotype specimen, designated by Robert Hoare in 2005, is held at the Natural History Museum, London.

Description

Meyrick described the adults of this species as follows:

The wingspan is 15–16.5 mm. The ground colour of the forewings is dark brown, largely overlain by narrow yellow scales. The hindwings are brown, but darker exteriorly. The larva of H. electrica has yet to be described.

Distribution 
This species is endemic to New Zealand and has been found in the northern and southern areas of the South Island. However this species has not been collected in Buller, Westland, or Canterbury.

Behaviour 
Adults of this species are on the wing from mid December until the end of February. This moth is day flying and has been seen on hot, sunny days. It was regarded by George Hudson as being rare and Robert Hoare states it appears to be rarer than its sister species H. s-fractum.

Hosts 
The larvae possibly feed on Ozothamnus species. However, reared specimens have also emerged from a spinning on Olearia nummulariifolia.

References

Moths described in 1889
Moths of New Zealand
Oecophoridae
Endemic fauna of New Zealand
Taxa named by Edward Meyrick
Endemic moths of New Zealand